The National Treasury is one of the departments of the South African government. The Treasury manages national economic policy, prepares the South African government's annual budget and manages the government's finances. Along with the South African Revenue Service and Statistics South Africa, the Treasury falls within the portfolio of the Minister of Finance. Throughout the course of President Jacob Zuma's second administration, the ministry has undergone several changes. Most notably, Nhlanhla Nene was suddenly dismissed on 9 December 2015, without explanation, and replaced with a relatively unknown parliamentary back-bencher from the ruling ANC's caucus, David 'Des' van Rooyen for a record-total of 3 days. He was, in turn, replaced by Pravin Gordhan after the President faced significant pressure from political and business groups over the move. On 30 March 2017 Jacob Zuma axed Pravin Gordhan and appointed Malusi Gigaba as a Finance Minister. Following Zuma's resignation, President Cyril Ramaphosa returned Nhlanhla Nene as Minister in his cabinet reshuffle on 26 February 2018.

In the 2010 national budget, the Treasury received an appropriation of 1,504.4 million rand and had 730 employees.

The Treasury has been responsible for South African Airways since December 2014

Ministers

See Also 
 National Budget of South Africa

References

External links 
 National Treasury
 South African Revenue Service

1910 establishments in South Africa
Government agencies established in 1910
Treasury
Finance in South Africa
South Africa